Masuri may refer to:

 Mussoorie, a hill station in the Indian state of Uttarakhand
 Magic Kid Masuri, a 2002 South Korean television series
 Sona Masuri, a medium-grain rice grown in India

See also
 Matsuri (disambiguation)